Cyme coccineotermen is a moth of the family Erebidae first described by Walter Rothschild in 1913. It is found in Papua New Guinea.

References

Moths described in 1913
Nudariina
Moths of New Guinea